Ellis Stanbury (1931-2007) was a Welsh international lawn and indoor bowler, and an industrial photographer by trade.

He won a bronze medal in the fours at the 1978 Commonwealth Games in Edmonton

References

1931 births
2007 deaths
Welsh male bowls players
Bowls players at the 1974 British Commonwealth Games
Bowls players at the 1978 Commonwealth Games
Commonwealth Games bronze medallists for Wales
Commonwealth Games medallists in lawn bowls
Medallists at the 1978 Commonwealth Games